Taryn Suttie (born December 7, 1990 in Saskatoon, Saskatchewan) is a Canadian track and field athlete competing in the shot put. She competed in the shot put event at the 2015 Pan American Games in Toronto, where she finished 10th.

In July 2016, she was officially named to Canada's Olympic team.

References

1990 births
Living people
Athletes (track and field) at the 2015 Pan American Games
Athletes from Saskatoon
Canadian female shot putters
Athletes (track and field) at the 2016 Summer Olympics
Olympic track and field athletes of Canada
Athletes (track and field) at the 2018 Commonwealth Games
Commonwealth Games competitors for Canada
Pan American Games track and field athletes for Canada
20th-century Canadian women
21st-century Canadian women